Point of No Return is the first and only studio album by American singer Shareefa. It was released on October 24, 2006 on Disturbing tha Peace and Def Jam South. Production was handled by Chucky Thompson, Rodney Jerkins, J.U.S.T.I.C.E. League, Rich Nice, Needlz, Salaam Remi, Ski Beatz, Adida and KQ. It features guest appearances from Ludacris and Bobby V. The album debuted at #25 on the Billboard 200 with nearly 37,000 copies sold in its first week. Its lead single "Need a Boss" peaked at number 62 on the Billboard Hot 100.

Track listing

Sample credits
"Cry No More" contains samples of "The Miracle" by The Stylistics.
"U Told Me" contains an interpolation of "Haunting Me" by Dave Grusin.
"Need a Boss" contains samples of "Let's Put It All Together" by The Stylistics.
"Butterfly" contains samples of "Mellow Mood (Part 1)" by Barry White.
"Phony" contains samples of "Earth, Wind and Fire" by Earth, Wind & Fire.
"Assumptions" contains samples of "Win or Lose" by Windy City.
"Hey Babe" contains an interpolation of "Dedicated to the One I Love" by The Shirelles.
"Trippin'" contains samples of "Munchies for Your Love" by Bootsy Collins.
"Fevah (He Don't Know)" contains samples of "Hangin Downtown" by Cameo.

Charts

References

External links

Shareefa albums
2006 debut albums
Albums produced by Needlz
Def Jam Recordings albums
Disturbing tha Peace albums
Albums produced by Salaam Remi
Albums produced by Rodney Jerkins
Albums produced by J.U.S.T.I.C.E. League